Elsa Margarita Noguera de la Espriella (born 30 September 1973) is a Colombian politician. She was the vice presidential nominee for the Radical Change in 2010, and in 2012 she was elected mayor of Barranquilla, the capital of Atlantico. She later served as the Minister of Housing, City and Territory. In 2020 she was elected the governor of the Atlantico Department, where Barranquilla is located.  

Noguera received a degree in international business from the American University in Washington D.C. She earned a master's degree in business administration and finance from Universidad del Norte.

References

1973 births
Living people
Colombian politicians
Mayors of places in Colombia
People from Barranquilla
Ministers of Housing, City and Territory of Colombia
Radical Change politicians
Women mayors of places in Colombia
Pontifical Xavierian University alumni
American University alumni